Dansez pentru tine (English: Dancing for you) was a show produced and broadcast on television station Pro TV, presented and moderated by Ștefan Bănică, Jr. and Iulia Vântur, now broadcast on Antena 1. It was the most watched entertainment show in Romania in recent years as audiences (17 shows aired in 2008 recorded an average audience of 7.7%). It was the Romanian version of the BBC's popular Dancing with the Stars, franchise which has been sold to more than 35 countries worldwide.

Judges 
 Mihai Petre
 Emilia Popescu
 Elwira Petre
 Beatrice Rancea
 Edi Stancu
 Mariana Bitang
 Octavian Bellu
 Răzvan Mazilu
 Cornel Patrichi
 Willmark

Former hosts
 Olivia Steer

Main series results

Overall ratings summary
The first episode was a big success for the ratings. Pro TV not only managed to have the biggest audience during the show, but managed to make Dansez pentru tine (Dancing with the Stars) the most viewed television show since 2006 to 2013 in Romania, with more than 120 editions.

References

External links
 Official website

 
2006 Romanian television series debuts
Dance competition television shows
Romanian reality television series
Pro TV original programming
2000s Romanian television series
Romanian television series based on British television series